Kosmos (Greek: Κόσμος της Πάτρας, English: The People of Patras) is a weekly newspaper that was founded in 2007 from Kosmos E.P.E. and is based in Patras in the Achaea prefecture in Greece. It holds an unselected and battlelike presence with the important talks which concerns its local information, and opened as one of the narrow regional newspapers. It features news of the week along with the scandalous news and other information. It is published every Friday. Parallel from the year 2002, it also published the newspaper Proini Gnomi with a different chronicle, who won the press in the press' event with information today. Its daily circulation does not pass over 7,000 newspapers and its numbers of readers does not increase.

See also
List of newspapers in Greece

References
The first version of the article is translated and is based from the article at the Greek Wikipedia (el:Main Page)

Greek-language newspapers
Newspapers published in Patras
Publications established in 2007
Weekly newspapers published in Greece
2007 establishments in Greece

el:Κόσμος της Πάτρας